The Midwest Women's Lacrosse Conference (MWLC) is a National Collegiate Athletic Association (NCAA) Division III women's lacrosse-only college athletic conference composed of schools located in the Midwestern United States.  All schools are members of other conferences in other sports and formed the MWLC until such time as their existing conferences add lacrosse. 

The MWLC was created one year after many of the member schools started a new men's lacrosse-only conference, the Midwest Lacrosse Conference. Founding members of the MWLC were Adrian College, Albion College, Carthage College, Concordia University Wisconsin, Fontbonne University, College of Mount St. Joseph, North Central College, and Trine University.

Adrian, Albion, and Trine left the league before the 2013 season when the Michigan Intercollegiate Athletic Association officially added lacrosse. However, the league added Augustana, Aurora, Beloit, and Benedictine that year. 2015 was another year of major change, losing Augustana, Carthage, Dubuque, Fontbonne, Mt. St. Joseph, and North Central. Joining the league were Cornell (IA), Illinois Tech, and Wartburg. Since then the league has added Augsburg, Concordia (IL), Hamline, Marian (WI), Monmouth, and Northwestern (MN).

Member schools

See also
 Midwest Lacrosse Conference

References

External links
 Website

College lacrosse leagues in the United States
NCAA Division III conferences
Women's lacrosse competitions in the United States